The General Synod of the Anglican Church of Canada is the chief governing and legislative body of the Anglican Church of Canada (ACC), the sole Canadian representative of the Anglican Communion. The first General Synod session was held in Toronto in 1893, with the proviso that the parameters of its authority would not undermine the local independence of dioceses.

Composition and responsibilities

Except in special instances when it may be called into session by the Primate of the Anglican Church of Canada or the Council of General Synod, the General Synod meets triennially at locations across Canada. Other recent locales for General Synod have been

2019: Vancouver, British Columbia
2016: Toronto, Ontario
2013: Ottawa, Ontario meeting in Joint Assembly with the National Church Council of the Evangelical Lutheran Church in Canada
2010: Halifax, Nova Scotia
2007: Winnipeg, Manitoba
2004: St. Catharines, Ontario
2001: Waterloo, Ontario
1998: Montreal, Quebec
1995: Ottawa, Ontario

The General Synod is composed of three Orders: Bishops, Clergy, and Laity. All bishops and archbishops of the ACC are members of General Synod; clergy and lay delegates are elected from each of the church's thirty dioceses, as well as the Canadian Forces and the religious orders.  Unlike the Church of England or the Episcopal Church in the United States of America, the Orders are not divided into Houses which meet separately according to different rules of order. Nonetheless, voting may be done by Orders with respect to certain issues, or on demand according to the rules of order, under which conditions a given Resolution would need to be approved in all three.

The General Synod is responsible for articulating the doctrine, discipline, and worship of the Anglican Church of Canada.  During its regular meetings, which generally span a week to nine days, members exchange information, set policy for the church, pass resolutions, and enact and amend canon law. Presently, there are twenty-two numbered canons, dealing with issues as prosaic as the name of the church, to ones touching on doctrine, such as matrimony and Holy Orders, to judicial disciplinary proceedings.

Officers of General Synod and the Council of General Synod
General Synod elects three of the nine officers who maintain certain executive responsibilities at and between Synods.  Of those, one - the Primate - holds office until he or she resigns, is removed, retires, or dies. The other officers, elected at each General Synod, are the Prolocutor and the Deputy Prolocutor.

The Prolocutor acts as the chief deputy to the Primate, and the second executive officer of General Synod.  As such, he chairs sessions of General Synod and meetings of the Council of General Synod in the absence of the Primate. The current Prolocutor is Cynthia Haines Turner; the Deputy Prolocutor is Peter Wall.

Council of General Synod
Between sessions of General Synod, the Council of General Synod (COGS) administers the affairs of the ACC. COGS is composed of the Primate, the Prolocutor, the Deputy Prolocutor, the Chancellor, and representatives from the three Orders from each of the four ecclesiastical provinces, chosen by the respective delegates at General Synod, the numbers of which vary according to a complicated electoral formula. COGS appoints four of the nine officers of General Synod:
 The General Secretary
 The Treasurer
 The Chancellor
 The Vice-Chancellor, if appointed
It also elects two Officers-at-large (one Clergy, one Laity).

Committees of General Synod
General Synod has six standing committees, consisting of members both elected at General Synod and appointed by the Primate:
 Faith, Worship and Ministry Committee: Responsible for liturgical issues;
 Partners in Mission Committee: Responsible for relationships with Anglican and ecumenical churches and organisations overseas;
 Eco-Justice Committee: Responsible for social and environmental issues;
 Pension Committee: Responsible for clergy and staff pension administration;
 Financial Management and Development Committee: Responsible for the ACC's financial affairs;
 Communications and Information Resources Committee: Responsible for the communications and publications of the ACC, including the Anglican Journal newspaper.

Important acts of recent General Synods
1995: General Synod approves the publication of a new hymnal, the first since 1971. Published in 1998, under the title Common Praise.
2001: General Synod approves full communion with the Evangelical Lutheran Church in Canada, under the provisions of the Waterloo Declaration.
2004:  Andrew Hutchison is elected twelfth Primate of the Anglican Church of Canada.  Synod votes to affirm "the integrity and sanctity of committed adult same-sex relationships."
2007:  Fred Hiltz was elected the thirteenth primate of the Anglican Church of Canada. Synod approved the "St. Michael Report", accepting that the blessing of same-sex unions is not a matter of "core doctrine" but rejected a motion that would have authorized dioceses to bless same-sex unions.  The motion was passed by the clergy and laity, but was narrowly defeated by the House of Bishops. General Synod, however, approved a motion calling for "pastoral care" of same-sex couples and called on the Primate's Theological Commission to recommend changes to the Marriage Canon to permit the marriage of all couples entitled under Canadian civil law (thus including gays and lesbians).
2016: Same-sex Marriage received approval in first reading by two thirds majority requiring a second approval in second reading at General Synod 2019

References

External links

About General Synod
Handbook of the General Synod of the Anglican Church of Canada
Joint Assembly (General Synod 2013) website
General Synod 2007 webpage
General Synod 2004
General Synod 2001
General Synod 1998

Recurring events established in 1893
1893 establishments in Canada
Anglican Church of Canada
Governing assemblies of religious organizations